Casey Knudsen (born November 9, 1990) is an American politician who has served in the Montana House of Representatives from the 33rd district since 2017.

References

1990 births
21st-century American politicians
Living people
Republican Party members of the Montana House of Representatives
Montana State University alumni
People from Havre, Montana